Only Everything is a solo album by Juliana Hatfield, released in 1995. Two singles with accompanying music videos were released from the album: "What a Life" and "Universal Heart-Beat." "Universal Heart-Beat" peaked at #5 on Billboard's Modern Rock Tracks in 1995.

Overview
Upon its release in 1995, Only Everything was notable for its sound, which was more aggressive than Hatfield's previous work. Produced by Paul Q. Kolderie and Sean Slade, who had previously produced Hole's very successful Live Through This, the album uses heavily distorted guitar tone with catchy pop songs.

Critical reception
AllMusic wrote that "even with the improved musicianship, Hatfield isn't able to deliver consistently impressive songs, occasionally relying on her cuteness to cover underdeveloped lyrics and pedestrian melodies." Trouser Press wrote that "Hatfield cranked it up on Only Everything without losing her instinctive pop charms or her treatises on what she describes as 'white, middle-class angst.'”

Track listing

Personnel
Credits adapted from CD liner notes.

 Juliana Hatfield – all vocals, all guitars, piano (1, 5, 7, 14), Wurlitzer piano (3), bass guitar (5, 7, 11, 12, 14), hand beats (8), Mellotron (12)
 Jim Fitting – baritone saxophone (4)
 Dean Fisher – bass guitar (1-4, 6-10, 13)
 Josh Freese – drums (1, 3-6, 9, 10, 14)
 Mike Levesque – drums (2, 7, 11-13)
 Paul Q. Kolderie – drum machine (8)
 Sean Slade – drum machine (8), clavinet (8)
 Walter Sear – theremin (4)

Production
Producers: Juliana Hatfield, Paul Q. Kolderie, Sean Slade
Engineers: Paul Q. Kolderie, Sean Slade
Assistant engineers: Edward Douglas, Bill Emmons, Fred Kevorkian, Carl Plaster
Mixing: Paul Q. Kolderie, Sean Slade
Art direction: Thomas Bricker
Photography: Michael Lavine
Cover art:  "Buffalo Medicine" by John Nieto (1994)

Charts

References

Juliana Hatfield albums
1995 albums
Albums produced by Paul Q. Kolderie
Albums produced by Sean Slade